Pishgun (also Romanized as Pīshgūn) is a village in Pain Khiyaban-e Litkuh Rural District, in the Central District of Amol County, Mazandaran Province, Iran. According to the 2006 census, its population was 256, spanning 57 families.

References 

Populated places in Amol County